Collision is a five-part British television drama serial, which debuted on ITV in November 2009. In the same month, it was also on PBS as a series in two parts. It tells the story of a group of strangers whose lives intertwine following a devastating car crash. The crash opens a number of startling revelations as stories of everything from government cover-ups and smuggling, to embezzlement and murder start to unravel.

The original British broadcast of Collision was edited from the original 5 hours (shown in five parts) down to three and a half hours (210 minutes, shown in two parts). The American broadcast on PBS's Masterpiece Contemporary, the Australian broadcast on ABC1 and the Region 1 (America and Canada) DVD release all featured the shortened version. In Australia, Foxtel and Austar's W Channel aired Collision in its original format of five 45-minute episodes (excluding advertisements), Tuesday, 15 March 2011.

Cast
 Douglas Henshall as DI John Tolin
 Kate Ashfield as Inspector Ann Stallwood
 Christopher Fulford as DCI Stephen Maitland
 Jo Woodcock as Jodie Tolin
 Craig Kelly as Jeffrey Rampton
 Dean Lennox Kelly as Danny Rampton
 Zoe Telford as Sandra Rampton
 Claire Rushbrook as Karen Donnelly
 Phil Davis as Brian Edwards
 Jan Francis as Christine Edwards
 Sylvia Syms as Joyce Thompson
 Paul McGann as Richard Reeves
 Lucy Griffiths as Jane Tarrant
 Lenora Crichlow as Alice Jackson
 David Bamber as Sidney Norris
 Nicholas Farrell as Guy Pearson
 Cornelius Macarthy as Tsegga
Victoria Wicks as Angela Reeves
Richard Harrington as Ben Hickman impersonating James Taylor

Episodes

References

External links 
 
 

2009 British television series debuts
2009 British television series endings
2000s British crime drama television series
2000s British television miniseries
English-language television shows
ITV mystery shows
Television shows written by Anthony Horowitz
Television series produced at Pinewood Studios